Scott Alexander Brownlee (born 19 March 1969) is a New Zealand rower.

Brownlee was born in 1969 in Christchurch, New Zealand. His father is the rower Mark Brownlee and his cousin is the politician Gerry Brownlee.

He represented New Zealand at the 1992, 1996, and 2000 Summer Olympics in the coxless four. He is listed as New Zealand Olympian athlete number 600 by the New Zealand Olympic Committee. Brownlee is currently the CEO of Schick Civil Construction Ltd.

References

1969 births
Living people
New Zealand male rowers
Olympic rowers of New Zealand
Rowers at the 1992 Summer Olympics
Rowers at the 1996 Summer Olympics
Rowers at the 2000 Summer Olympics
Rowers from Christchurch